The Serchio is the third longest river in the Italian region of Tuscany at , coming after the Arno at  and the Ombrone, . By mean rate of flow, it is the second largest, smaller than Arno but larger than Ombrone.

The principal source forms on the slopes of Monte Sillano, elevation  and is joined by a secondary branch, the Serchio di Gramolazzo, at Piazza al Serchio.

The river then crosses Garfagnana from north to south, from Sillano to a location beyond Castelnuovo di Garfagnana; from here it continues through the Media Valle touching the municipal borders of the Comune of Barga and crossing the territory of Borgo a Mozzano. In this section of the river, which is dammed in a number of places, it receives from the right the waters of the Edron, Tùrrite Secca, Tùrrite di Gallicano, Turrite Cava and the Pedogna; and from the left those of the Fiume, the Castiglione, the Sillico, and its most important tributary the Lima.

Having reached the plain of Lucca, where it is joined by the torrent Freddana, the Serchio turns westwards, crosses the “straits” of Filettole, and enters the Province of Pisa. Here it runs through San Giuliano Terme and Vecchiano before entering the Tyrrhenian Sea in the area of the Parco di San Rossore, a few kilometres to the north of Pisa.

The national road SS 12 (Abetone – Brennero) follows the course of the Serchio already to a Lucca's valley, after going up until Bagni di Lucca;
from here until the origins, from street to Capanne di Sillano and the step of Pradarena.

The localities that the river crosses are, in Garfagnana: Castelnuovo di Garfagnana, Barga, Bagni di Lucca; and in Lucchesia: Borgo a Mozzano and Lucca.

See also
 Ponte della Maddalena

External links
 Authority of river basin
 Tourism

Drainage basins of the Tyrrhenian Sea
Rivers of Italy
Rivers of Tuscany
Rivers of the Province of Lucca
Rivers of the Province of Pisa